Linda Rosenkrantz (born May 26, 1934) is an American writer, known for her innovations in the realm of  “nonfiction fiction,” most prominently in her novel Talk, a New York Review Books classic.

Life and career 

Linda Rosenkrantz was born and raised up in the Bronx, New York, the daughter of Samuel, a garment industry executive, and Frances, an artist. She is a graduate of the High School of Music and Art in Manhattan and the University of Michigan.

After college, she joined the Editorial and Publicity Department of Parke-Bernet auction galleries. She was the founding editor of Auction magazine, published first by Sotheby-Parke-Bernet, and then by Institutional Investor, from 1967 to 1972, featuring original cover art by such artists as Salvador Dalí and Peter Hujar, and articles by eminent art critics and antiques experts.

In 1975, Rosenkrantz was the subject of an early Chuck Close color-grid painting, Linda, now owned by the Akron Art Museum. Around this time, Rosenkrantz was a part of the New York art world, her immediate circle including such artists as Hujar, Joseph Raffael, Paul Thek and Susan Brockman, being a charter member of Ray Johnson’s New York Correspondence School, as well as attending Warhol parties at the Factory.

In 1986, Rosenkrantz began writing a weekly column, Contemporary Collectibles, which was widely syndicated by Copley News Service for 25 years. In 1990, she relocated to Los Angeles with her husband, writer Christopher Finch, and daughter Chloe.

Talk 
In 1968, Rosenkrantz’s novel Talk, based on the taped conversations of herself and two friends in East Hampton, Long Island, was published by Putnam’s in New York and by Anthony Blond in London two years later, followed by a New American Library paperback edition. Talk was the subject of a double-page spread in the fledgling New York magazine and garnered feature reviews in, among others, The New York Times, Washington Post, American Vogue and in British Vogue, which picked it as one of its Books of the Year.

Nearly half a century later, Talk was reissued as a New York Review Books Classic, receiving positive attention in The New York Times, New Statesman, The Guardian, Paris Review (whose then-editor Lorin Stein, picked Talk as his #1 summer book of 2015), New Republic, The Nation Harper's, The Village Voice (”a favorite of the year”), and other periodicals. An excerpt appeared on Literary Hub, and Rosenkrantz was featured on NPR’s Bookworm show and New York magazine’s Sex Lives podcast.

Talk has been translated into Spanish, La Charla, published by Editorial Anagrama, Barcelona 2017 and into Italian, Talk!, 8tto Edizioni, Milano 2019.

Peter Hujar’s Day 

In 1974, Linda Rosenkrantz embarked on another tapecentric project. She asked a number of her friends and acquaintances, including artist Chuck Close and photographer Peter Hujar, to write down everything they did on one particular day, then to meet with her to report and record in conversation the events of their day. Forty years later, in 2021, a transcript of the Hujar chapter was published in book form by Magic Hour Press as Peter Hujar’s Day. Articles about and by Rosenkrantz appeared in such international publications as i-D, Frieze.com, El Pais and The Guardian

Baby Names 

In 1988, Rosenkrantz co-wrote with Pamela Redmond Satran, Beyond Jennifer and Jason: An Enlightened Guide to Naming Your Baby, (St. Martin’s Press), a book that is considered to have revolutionized the naming of children in the US and beyond, the first name guide to organize names into lists, identify style trends, calculate name popularity, and analyze the effects of pop culture on naming trends. This was followed by a series of nine more books on such specialty areas as British names, Irish names, Jewish names, and Cool Names and the encyclopedic Baby Name Bible.

In 2008, the website nameberry.com was launched by Rosenkrantz and Satran, based on their ten books on the subject. Nameberry has become the world's leading website devoted to baby names. It is widely recognized as the international authority on baby name style, history, and trends, attracting six million unique monthly visitors and 25 million page views from virtually every country around the world, and is still growing.

Ex 
In 2018, five sections of Rosenkrantz’s taped work-in-progress, Ex, were excerpted and published in comix form on the Lena Dunham/Jenni Konner website lennyletter. The concept of this book was to invite a number of old boyfriends for dinner, one by one, serve each of them the same menu, and have a tape recorder running from the moment they entered her Upper East Side apartment to the moment they left. The resultant edited transcripts display not only a diversity of male personalities but shifting versions of Rosenkrantz herself.

Bibliography 
Talk, G. P. Putnams, 1968 
Gone Hollywood: The Movie Colony in the Golden Age (with Christopher Finch), Doubleday, 1979
Soho (novel written with Christopher Finch under pseudonym C. L. Byrd), Doubleday (publisher), 1983
Beyond Jennifer & Jason (with Pamela Redmond Satran), St. Martin’s Press, 1988
Sotheby’s Guide to Animation Art (with Christopher Finch), Henry Holt & Co, 1998
My Life as a List: 207 Things about My Bronx Childhood, Clarkson Potter, 1999
Telegram: Modern History as Told Through More Than 400 Witty, Poignant and Revealing Telegrams, Henry Holt & Co, 2003
Cool Names for Babies (with Pamela Redmond Satran), St. Martin’s Press, 2003
The Baby Name Bible (with Pamela Redmond Satran), St. Martin’s Press, 2007
Talk, New York Review Books Classics, 2015
Peter Hujar’s Day, Magic Hour Press, 2021

References

Women writers (modern period)
Writers from New York City
University of Michigan alumni
People from the Bronx
1934 births
Living people